Durango is a state in Northwest Mexico that is divided into 39 municipalities. According to the 2020 Mexican Census, Durango is the 25th most populous state with  inhabitants, but the 4th largest by land area spanning .

Municipalities in Durango are administratively autonomous of the state according to the 115th article of the 1917 Constitution of Mexico. Every three years, citizens elect a municipal president (Spanish: presidente municipal) by a plurality voting system who heads a concurrently elected municipal council (ayuntamiento) responsible for providing all the public services for their constituents. The municipal council consists of a variable number of trustees and councillors (regidores y síndicos). Municipalities are responsible for public services (such as water and sewerage), street lighting, public safety, traffic, and the maintenance of public parks, gardens and cemeteries. They may also assist the state and federal governments in education, emergency fire and medical services, environmental protection and maintenance of monuments and historical landmarks. Since 1984, they have had the power to collect property taxes and user fees, although more funds are obtained from the state and federal governments than from their own income.

The smallest municipality by population is San Pedro del Gallo with 1,633 residents. The largest municipality by land area is also Durango which spans , and the smallest is Vicente Guerrero which spans . Most municipalities were incorporated upon the division of the state of Durango into municipal units by the Constitución Política del Estado Libre de Durango on September 1, 1825, shortly after the state was admitted to the Union of Mexico. The most recent municipality to incorporate is Nuevo Ideal, on January 1, 1989.

Municipalities

<noinclude>

Notes

References

 
Durango